University is a neighborhood in Denver, Colorado. It is home to the University of Denver, many university students, and other residents and businesses, including the first Chipotle Mexican Grill.

Geography
University is a neighborhood as defined by the city of Denver. The boundaries of University are the following:
North – Interstate 25
West – Downing Street
East – University Boulevard
South – Denver/Englewood Boundary

References
City and County of Denver map specifying University Neighborhood boundaries, Accessed May 2, 2008

Neighborhoods in Denver